Spider were a British band from Liverpool, England, that formed in 1976 and were part of the new wave of British heavy metal (NWOBHM).

The band, who were often compared to Status Quo, offered an upbeat sound, which was described as boogie rock.
Spider released three albums in the 10 years they were together, titled Rock 'n' Roll Gypsies (1982) Rough Justice (1984)  and Raise the Banner (For Rock 'n' Roll) (1986)

The band split in 1986.

Career
Spider formed in 1976, consisted of four young men from Wallasey, including two brothers, none of whom had played in bands before.

After releasing "Children of the Street" on the Alien Record Label, Spider were playing, on average 20 dates a month, which included a support slot on the Uriah Heep 1980 Winter Tour.

1982 proved to be the band's most lucrative year. It began in late 1981 when the band were contracted to record for BBC Radio 1 Friday Rock Show. The producer, Tony Wilson, introduced them to Maggi Farren, who set up a recording deal with Creole Records as well as getting the band a support slot on the 1981 Slade Winter Tour.

Spider released the single "Talkin' 'bout Rock 'n' Roll" with Creole, which featured as part of BBC Radio 1's play list. They then went into the studio to begin recording their first album Rock 'n' Roll Gypsies, to be released on the Creole label also. However RCA, who had made a late bid for the band, and after negotiations, Spider signed a six-year recording contract with the record label.

1982 continued with Spider packing out the Marquee Club once a month. They supported Alice Cooper on the British leg of his Special Forces Tour. They played at the Reading Festival on Sunday 29 August 1982, as well as securing a support slot on the mammoth Gillan Tour in coincidence with the release of their first album.

Dave Bryce, guitarist, currently plays with London rock band AWOL.

On 22nd of July 2022 it was announced on the bands Facebook page that Colin Harkness had passed away, he was aged 62.

Band members
 Colin Harkness - lead vocals, guitar died July 2022
 Dave "Sniffa" Bryce - guitar, backing vocals
 Brian Burrows - bass, backing vocals
 Rob E. Burrows - drums

Discography

Albums

Singles
1977: "Back to the Wall"
1980: "Children of the Street"
1980: "College Luv"
1981: "All the Time"
1982: "Talkin' 'Bout Rock 'n' Roll"
1982: "Rock 'n' Roll Forever Will Last"
1982: "Amazing Grace Medley" (Free with Rock 'n' Roll Forever Will Last) 
1983: "Why D'Ya Lie to Me" 
1984: "Here we go Rock 'n' Roll" 
1984: "Breakaway" 
1986: "Gimme Gimme It All"

See also
List of new wave of British heavy metal bands

References

External links
 SPIDER BOOGIE FANWAGON
 Spider Fan Site 
Classic Rock Magazine - Cult Heroes no. 32

English heavy metal musical groups
Musical groups established in 1976
Musical groups disestablished in 1986
Musical groups from Liverpool
New Wave of British Heavy Metal musical groups